Estonia originally planned to participate in the Eurovision Song Contest 2020 with the song "What Love Is" written by Uku Suviste and Sharon Vaughn. The song was performed by Uku Suviste. The Estonian broadcaster  (ERR) organised the national final  in order to select the Estonian entry for the 2020 contest in Rotterdam, Netherlands. The national final consisted of three shows: two semi-finals and a final. Twelve songs competed in each semi-final and six from each semi-final as determined by a jury panel and public vote qualified to the final. In the final, the winner was selected over two rounds of voting. In the first round, a jury panel and a public vote selected the top three to qualify to the superfinal. In the superfinal, "What Love Is" performed by Uku Suviste was selected as the winner entirely by a public vote.

Estonia was drawn to compete in the second semi-final of the Eurovision Song Contest which took place on 14 May 2020. However, the contest was cancelled due to the COVID-19 pandemic.

Background

Prior to the 2020 Contest, Estonia had participated in the Eurovision Song Contest twenty-five times since its first entry in 1994, winning the contest on one occasion in 2001 with the song "Everybody" performed by Tanel Padar, Dave Benton and 2XL. Following the introduction of semi-finals for the 2004, Estonia has, to this point, managed to qualify to the final on seven occasions. In 2019, "Storm" performed by Victor Crone managed to qualify Estonia to the final where the song placed twentieth.

The Estonian national broadcaster,  (ERR), broadcasts the event within Estonia and organises the selection process for the nation's entry. ERR confirmed Estonia's participation at the 2020 Eurovision Song Contest on 6 August 2019. Since their debut, the Estonian broadcaster has organised national finals that feature a competition among multiple artists and songs in order to select Estonia's entry for the Eurovision Song Contest. The  competition has been organised since 2009 in order to select Estonia's entry and on 30 August 2019, ERR announced the organisation of Eesti Laul 2020 in order to select the nation's 2020 entry.

Before Eurovision

Eesti Laul 2020
 was the twelfth edition of the Estonian national selection , which selected Estonia's entry for the Eurovision Song Contest 2020. The competition consisted of twenty-four entries competing in two semi-finals on 13 and 15 February 2020 leading to a twelve-song final on 29 February 2020.

Format
The format of the competition included two semi-finals on 13 and 15 February 2020 and a final on 29 February 2020. Twelve songs competed in each semi-final and the top six from each semi-final qualified to complete the twelve song lineup in the final. The results of the semi-finals was determined by the 50/50 combination of votes from a professional jury and public televoting for the first four qualifiers and a second round of public televoting for the fifth and sixth qualifiers. The winning song in the final was selected over two rounds of voting: the first round results selected the top three songs via the 50/50 combination of jury and public voting, while the second round (superfinal) determined the winner solely by public televoting. In addition to winning the right to represent Estonia at the 2020 Eurovision Song Contest, the winning songwriters and producers were also awarded monetary prizes of €3,000 and €1,000, respectively. The Estonian Authors' Society and Estonian Performers Association also awarded a monetary prize of €1,000 to the top three entries.

Competing entries 
On 1 September 2019, ERR opened the submission period for artists and composers to submit their entries up until 6 November 2019 through an online upload platform. Each artist and songwriter was only able to submit a maximum of five entries. Foreign collaborations were allowed as long as 50% of the songwriters were Estonian. A fee was also imposed on songs being submitted to the competition, with €25 for songs in the Estonian language and €50 for songs in other languages. 178 submissions were received by the deadline. A 14-member jury panel selected 24 semi-finalists from the submissions and the selected songs were announced during the ETV entertainment program Ringvaade on 13 and 14 November 2019. The selection jury consisted of Andres Puusepp (DJ), Anu Varusk (Warner Music Baltics regional marketing manager), Birgit Sarrap (singer), Daniel Levi (singer), Eda-Ines Etti (singer), Hendrik Sal-Saller (musician), Jüri Makarov (Rock Summer organiser), Kaupo Karelson (television producer), Lauri Hermann (Raadio Elmar presenter), Madis Aesma (musician), Maiken (singer), Owe Petersell (Raadio Elmar chief editor), Sten Teppan (Vikerradio music editor) and Vaido Pannel (Raadio Sky+ music editor).

Among the competing artists were previous Eurovision Song Contest entrants Laura, who represented Estonia in 2005 as part of the group Suntribe and in 2017 together with Koit Toome, and Stig Rästa (as member of Traffic), who represented Estonia in 2015 with Elina Born. Little Mess' entry was written by Tanja, who represented Estonia in 2014, and Traffic's entry was written by Victor Crone, who represented Estonia in 2019.

Semi-finals 
Two semi-finals took place on 13 and 15 February 2020 at the University of Tartu Sports Hall in Tartu, hosted by Karl-Erik Taukar and Tõnis Niinemets. In each semi-final twelve songs competed for the first four spots in the final with the outcome decided upon by the combination of the votes from a jury panel and a public televote, with the remaining two qualifiers decided by an additional televote between the remaining non-qualifiers.

In addition to the performances of the competing entries, Ines, who represented Estonia in the Eurovision Song Contest 2000, and the group 5Miinust performed as the interval acts in semi-final 1, and the band Black Velvet performed as the interval act in semi-final 2.

Final
The final took place on 29 February 2020 at the Saku Suurhall in Tallinn, hosted by Karl-Erik Taukar and Tõnis Niinemets. The six entries that qualified from each of the two preceding semi-finals, all together twelve songs, competed during the show. The winner was selected over two rounds of voting. In the first round, an international jury (50%) and public televote (50%) determined the top three entries to proceed to the superfinal. The public vote in the first round registered 47,082 votes. In the superfinal, "What Love Is" performed by Uku Suviste was selected as the winner entirely by a public televote. The public televote in the superfinal registered 49,216 votes. In addition to the performances of the competing entries, Tanel Padar, who represented Estonia in the Eurovision Song Contest 2001, Victor Crone, who represented Estonia in the Eurovision Song Contest 2019, the group Púr Múdd, and singers Anne Veski and Karl-Erik Taukar performed as the interval acts. The international jury panel that voted in the first round of the final consisted of Mads Enggaard (Dansk Melodi Grand Prix producer), Prince Charles Alexander (American producer), Sylvia Massy (American producer), Felix Bergsson (Icelandic Eurovision Head of Delegation), Daniel Cantor (American producer), Fredi Lunden (Warner Music Finland artist manager), Kazka (Ukrainian band), Kimbra (New Zealand singer and producer) and Brian Henry (British keyboardist).

At Eurovision 
According to Eurovision rules, all nations with the exceptions of the host country and the "Big Five" (France, Germany, Italy, Spain and the United Kingdom) are required to qualify from one of two semi-finals in order to compete for the final; the top ten countries from each semi-final progress to the final. The European Broadcasting Union (EBU) split up the competing countries into six different pots based on voting patterns from previous contests, with countries with favourable voting histories put into the same pot. On 28 January 2020, a special allocation draw was held which placed each country into one of the two semi-finals, as well as which half of the show they would perform in. Estonia was placed into the second semi-final, to be held on 14 May 2020, and was scheduled to perform in the first half of the show. However, due to 2019-20 pandemic of Coronavirus, the contest was cancelled.

During the Eurovision Song Celebration YouTube broadcast in place of the semi-finals, it was revealed that Estonia was set to perform in position 2, following the entry from Greece and before the entry from Austria.

References

External links

2020
Countries in the Eurovision Song Contest 2020
Eurovision